is a Japanese wrestler won a bronze medal at the 2012 Summer Olympics in the Greco-Roman 60 kg category.

Matsumoto graduated from the Nippon Sport Science University in Tokyo and is competing for the Gunma Yakult club. His younger brother, Atsushi Matsumoto, is also an international wrestler.

References

External links
 

Living people
1986 births
Japanese male sport wrestlers
Wrestlers at the 2012 Summer Olympics
Olympic bronze medalists for Japan
Olympic medalists in wrestling
Olympic wrestlers of Japan
Asian Games medalists in wrestling
Wrestlers at the 2010 Asian Games
Medalists at the 2012 Summer Olympics
Wrestlers at the 2014 Asian Games
World Wrestling Championships medalists
Asian Games silver medalists for Japan
Asian Games bronze medalists for Japan
Medalists at the 2010 Asian Games
Medalists at the 2014 Asian Games
21st-century Japanese people